Meridian is a city located in Ada County in the U.S. state of Idaho. As of the 2020 census, the population of Meridian was 117,635, making it the second largest city in the county and Idaho after Boise, the state capital. Meridian is considered the state's fastest-growing city and among the fastest-growing cities in the United States.

History
The town was established in 1891 on the Onweiler farm north of the present site and was called Hunter. Two years later an I.O.O.F. lodge was organized and called itself Meridian because it was located on the Boise Meridian and the town was renamed. The Settlers' Irrigation Ditch, 1892, changed the arid region into a productive farming community which was incorporated in 1902.

Meridian was incorporated in 1903. The information in the following sections (Irrigation, Village, Rail Transportation, and Creamery) is found on the displays in the Meridian City Hall Plaza.

Irrigation (1890– )
Early settlers arriving in the area came with no knowledge of gravity flow irrigation. Their previous homes were in areas where rain provided the needed moisture to raise crops. Irrigation soon became a necessity, since having a water source was a requirement for receiving the patent for the land from the U.S. Land Office. Irrigation districts, such as the Nampa-Meridian and Settlers irrigation districts, continue to serve the immediate Meridian area.

Village (1903–41)
The original Meridian town site was filed in 1893 on homestead grant land belonging to Eliza Ann Zenger. Her husband, Christian, filed the plat with county officials and called it Meridian. The early settlers, many of whom were relatives, left their homes in Missouri to go west, either by wagon, train, or immigrant railroad car, bringing their lodge and church preferences with them. They established local institutions soon after arriving and filed for homestead lands.

Around the start of the 20th century, settlers established fruit orchards and built fruit packing businesses and prune dryers along the railroad tracks. Local orchards produced many varieties of apples and Italian prunes. Production continued through the mid-1940s when it was no longer profitable and the businesses closed. In 1941, Meridian's status changed from a village to a city.

Rail transportation (1908–28)
Following the raising of $4,000 to lay the Interurban rail line from Onweiler (Meridian and Ustick Roads), the tracks were completed into the village center. Turning east on Broadway and ending at East Second, the last car would spend the night in Meridian before returning to Boise early the next morning with passengers and freight. The interurban Station and Generator building (west one-third of the old library at Meridian and Idaho Streets) was built in 1912, and the line continued on to Nampa via Meridian. The tracks down Broadway were not used after 1912. The Interurban Company entered into receivership and closed in 1928 after 20 years of providing continuous transportation to neighboring towns. It was Meridian's main connection to the area outside the local community.

The Union Pacific Railroad spur opened in 1900 and is currently operated by the Boise Valley Railroad. Many industrial customers continue to ship forest, agricultural, and chemical products along this corridor.

Creamery (1929–70)

The lowest days of the Great Depression brightened for area dairymen when the Ada County Dairymen's cooperative creamery began operation in 1929. It provided milk checks to those who were members of the cooperative, enabling them to pay their taxes and provide food for their families. Other community members hauled milk to the creamery and were employed by the creamery, whose product was Challenge Butter.

The creamery ran 7 days a week for 40 years. Additions and improvements were made while the plant was in full operation. Later years saw the Wyeth Laboratories affiliate with the creamery to manufacture SMA baby formula.

After the creamery ceased local operations in 1970, the dairymen shipped their milk to the Caldwell creamery for processing.

Geography
Meridian is located at  (43.614229, -116.398963).

The majority of Meridian lies on a flat plain, roughly in the north central part of Treasure Valley. There is a low bench along the south east edge of the city. The city is crossed by several irrigation canals that generally run from the south east to the north west. The Boise River runs north of the city. The Snake River runs far south of the city. Squaw Butte is visible to the north at 5,873 feet (1,790 m). Shafer Butte is visible to the north east at 7,572 feet (2,308 m). The Owyhee Mountains are visible to the far south.

Climate
Meridian's climate is characterized as semi-arid with four distinct seasons. Meridian experiences hot and dry summers where temperatures can often exceed 100 °F (38 °C), as well as cold winters with occasional light snowfall. Rainfall is usually infrequent and light, usually averaging less than an inch (25.4 mm) per month. Spring and fall are generally temperate.

Demographics

2010 census
As of the census of 2010, there were 75,092 people, 25,302 households, and 19,916 families living in the city. The racial makeup of the city was 92.0% White, 0.8% African American, 0.5% Native American, 1.8% Asian, 0.1% Pacific Islander, 1.9% from other races, and 2.9% from two or more races. Hispanic or Latino of any race were 6.8% of the population.

There were 25,302 households, of which 47.6% had children under the age of 18 living with them, 63.9% were married couples living together, 10.4% had a female householder with no husband present, 4.4% had a male householder with no wife present, and 21.3% were non-families. 16.6% of all households were made up of individuals, and 6% had someone living alone who was 65 years of age or older. The average household size was 2.96 and the average family size was 3.33.

The median age in the city was 32.5 years. 33.4% of residents were under the age of 18; 6.6% were between the ages of 18 and 24; 30.5% were from 25 to 44; 20.7% were from 45 to 64; and 8.9% were 65 years of age or older. The gender makeup of the city was 49.0% male and 51.0% female.

2000 census
As of the census of 2000, there were 34,919 people, 11,829 households, and 9,515 families living in the city. The population density was 2,962.1/sq mi. There were 12,293 housing units at an average density of 1,042.8 per square mile. The racial makeup of the city was 96.3% White, 0.7% African American, 1% Native American, 2% Asian, 0.3% Pacific Islander, 1.9% from other races, and 2.12% from two or more races. Hispanic or Latino of any race were 3.7% of the population.

There were 11,829 households, out of which 49% had children under the age of 18 living with them, 68.4% were married couples living together, 8.8% had a female householder with no husband present, and 19.6% were non-families. 14.5% of all households were made up of individuals, and 4.3% had someone living alone who was 65 years of age or older. The average household size was 2.93 and the average family size was 3.26.

In the city, the population was spread out, with 33.7% under the age of 18, 6.9% from 18 to 24, 37.1% from 25 to 44, 15.8% from 45 to 64, and 6.4% who were 65 years of age or older. The median age was 30 years. For every 100 females, there were 96.4 males. For every 100 females age 18 and over, there were 93.7 males.

The median income for a household in the city was $53,276, and the median income for a family was $57,077. Males had a median income of $40,360 versus $27,174 for females. The per capita income for the city was $20,150. About 4.6% of families and 5.6% of the population were below the poverty line, including 7.0% of those under age 18 and 7.6% of those age 65 or over.

Economy
Blue Cross of Idaho and Scentsy are based in Meridian. The Idaho State Police is headquartered in Meridian and the state police academy is housed on its campus. All police officers statewide are required to attend basic training at the facility.

Government
Meridian has a mayor that serves four-year terms and received an annual salary of $90,956 in 2018. Meridian has a city council of six members. Every two years, three city council seats are up for re-election. Members of the council serve four-year terms and received annual compensation of $10,000 as of 2018.

The mayor, with the consent of the city council, appoints the following officers: 
 City Attorney
 Public Works Director
 Chief of Police
 Fire Chief
 Planning Director
 Parks and Rec Director
 Chief Financial Officer

Arts and culture
The Meridian Symphony Orchestra celebrated its 20th anniversary season in 2009–10.

Art is on display in the Initial Point Gallery on the third floor of the Meridian City Hall. The gallery is open to the public with free admission.

In popular culture
The Clint Eastwood film Bronco Billy (1980) was partially filmed in Meridian.

The book series Michael Vey by Richard Paul Evans is partially set in Meridian, with significant events occurring within the area in the first book of the series: Michael Vey: The Prisoner of Cell 25.

Parks and recreation

The city's Parks and Rec department manages 17 public parks throughout Meridian including Meridian Settlers Regional Park which hosts free outdoor movies during the summer months.

The Meridian Speedway lies within city limits directly south of Old Town Meridian.

Meridian shares boundaries with the largest and 3rd largest cities in Idaho, Boise to the east and Nampa to the west. Therefore, residents of Meridian often take advantage of the recreation and sports opportunities in those cities.

The Snake River Birds of Prey National Conservation Area is south of Meridian.

Education
The West Ada School District serves the city and is the largest in the state. Meridian is part of the Boise metropolitan area.

Infrastructure

Transportation
The majority of the city lies north of I-84. Streets are named with a north, south, east or west prefix identifying the orientation of the street and where the street is in relation to the intersection of Franklin Road and Meridian Road. Roads with a north prefix are north of Franklin Road (which runs east and west). Roads with a west prefix are west of Meridian Road (which runs north and south). Many residents identify which section of the city they live in by the closest intersection of major roads that are generally laid out in square miles. From west to east, the major roads are Black Cat, Ten Mile, Linder, Meridian, Locust Grove, and Eagle. From north to south, the major roads are Chinden (Highway 20/26), McMillan, Ustick, Cherry (west of Meridian) or Fairview (east of Meridian), Franklin, Overland, Victory, and Amity.

I-84 is between Franklin and Overland. Pine is another major road that runs east/west and lies between Cherry and Franklin.

A railroad line runs east/west and lies between Pine and Franklin. Most of the city's industrial areas are concentrated along this railroad line with some other industrial areas near the east side of the city south west of the intersection of Fairview and Eagle. The line was formerly owned by Union Pacific, but Boise Valley Railroad now owns the line, running trains on weekdays from Boise to Nampa.

Old-town Meridian centers around the intersection of Main Street and Pine Street. In the older section of the city, there are numbered streets up to 15th Street to the west and up to 5th Street to the east.

Notable people

 William Agee, business executive
 Davey Hamilton, Indy 500 driver
 Vern Law, Major League Baseball player
 Spencer Nead, former fullback for the New England Patriots
 Ron Packard, former congressman from California who was born in Meridian.
 Gracie Pfost, first woman elected to Congress from Idaho
 Randy Tolsma, NASCAR driver
 Wilbert Lee Gore, creator of Gore-Tex
 Mike Gabler, winner of Survivor 43

See also

References

External links
 
 City of Meridian, Idaho Website Portal style website, Government, Business, Library, Recreation and more
 Meridian Photo Gallery
 City-Data.com Comprehensive Statistical Data and more about Meridian

 
Cities in Idaho
Cities in Ada County, Idaho
Boise metropolitan area
Treasure Valley
1893 establishments in Idaho
Populated places established in 1893